Kevin Smyth (born November 22, 1973) is a Canadian former professional ice hockey player who played 58 games in the National Hockey League. He played with the Hartford Whalers. He spent parts of three seasons with the Hartford Whalers between 1993 and 1996, playing 58 games for them. Though his big league career was fairly short, he was an explosive scorer in junior and a solid two way worker in the minors.

His younger brother is former longtime Edmonton Oilers forward Ryan Smyth.

Playing career
Smyth was chosen 79th overall by the Whalers in 1992 after a 30-goal season with the WHL's Moose Jaw Warriors. He returned to junior and notched 44 goals before seeing action in 21 games as an NHL rookie in 1993-94. Smyth spent most of his first three pro seasons in the AHL but was recalled by Hartford periodically as an injury replacement. The hard working forward joined the IHL's Orlando Solar Bears in 1996 and became a solid worker in the IHL. He currently (2013–14) plays for the Innisfail, Alberta Eagles of the Chinook Hockey League, after several seasons with the Bentley Generals.

Visual impairment
On December 28, 1996, in a game against the Indianapolis Ice, Smyth took a puck to his eye after a point shot deflected off a stick and hit him in the right eye. The force of the puck was great enough to detach his retina and cause a ruptured globe, with enough force to blind him. Smyth later admitted that upon seeing the medical assessment, the force of the puck was strong enough to do significant damage to his eyeball. Smyth returned to active play on March 19, 1997 and recorded an assist in his first game back after the injury.

Career statistics

Regular season and playoffs

References

External links

1973 births
Living people
Canadian ice hockey left wingers
Hartford Whalers draft picks
Hartford Whalers players
Ice hockey people from Alberta
Idaho Steelheads (WCHL) players
Moose Jaw Warriors players
People from Banff, Alberta
Tacoma Sabercats players
Springfield Indians players
Orlando Solar Bears (IHL) players
Las Vegas Thunder players